Alfonso V may refer to:
 Alfonso V of León (999–1028)
 Alfonso V of Aragon (1416–1458), The Magnanimous
 Afonso V of Portugal (1432–1481), The African